Anerastia is a genus of snout moths. It was described by Jacob Hübner in 1825 and is known from Egypt and Sudan.

Species
 Anerastia celsella Walker, 1863
 Anerastia dubia Gerasimov, 1929
 Anerastia flaveolella Ragonot, 1887
 Anerastia gnathosella (Amsel, 1954)
 Anerastia incarnata Staudinger, 1879
 Anerastia infumella Ragonot, 1887
 Anerastia lavatella Zerny in Rebel & Zerny, 1917
 Anerastia lotella (Hübner, 1813)
 Anerastia metallactis Meyrick, 1887
 Anerastia mitochroella Ragonot, 1888
 Anerastia stramineipennis Strand, 1919

References

Anerastiini
Pyralidae genera
Taxa named by Jacob Hübner